Central Mall is an enclosed shopping mall in Port Arthur, Texas, United States. Opened in 1982, it features Dillard's, J. C. Penney, Target, TJ Maxx and a B&B Theatre.

History
The mall opened in 1982 with J. C. Penney, Dillard's, Sears, Bealls (now Stage), and The White House. Target was added in 2004. Hurricane Rita destroyed the roof of the Dillard's store, which reopened in 2006. Hobby Lobby, which replaced the former White House store, was damaged beyond repair. Hobby Lobby is also now closed. Other parts of the mall sustained roof damage as well.

Bed Bath & Beyond joined the mall in late 2006-early 2007. Steve & Barry's, added in 2005, closed in 2008. The space was previously Old Navy, which closed in 2004.

In 2013, TJ Maxx and Shoe Dept. Encore were added. The former replaced a Luby's and a Gap which had closed in 2005, and the latter replaced the former Old Navy/Steve & Barry's.

On December 28, 2018, it was announced that Sears would be closing as part of a plan to close 80 stores nationwide. The store closed in March 2019.

On September 15, 2022, it was announced that Bed Bath & Beyond would be closing as part of a plan to close 150 stores nationwide.

References

External links
Official website

Shopping malls in Texas
Shopping malls established in 1982
Kohan Retail Investment Group
Port Arthur, Texas